Nyalam may refer to:

Nyalam County, county in Tibet
Nyalam Town, town in Tibet